Parliamentary elections were held in Iraq on 5 May 1958 to elect the members of the Chamber of Deputies. It was the last election in monarchical Iraq. Most political parties had been dissolved in 1954. The main opposition coalition, the National Union Front, decided to boycott the elections. Candidates supportive of the government won 140 of the 145 seats, whilst independent candidates won the remaining five. The new parliament lasted two months only. On 14 July the monarchical government was overthrown in a military coup, and another election the same year would institute Abd al-Karim Qasim as president of the new Iraqi Republic.

References

Iraq
Parliamentary election
Elections in Iraq
Iraqi parliamentary election